Mamudpur is a village in Srirampore subdivision of Hooghly district, West Bengal, India.

It can also refer to:
Mamudpur, Arambagh, a village in Arambagh subdivision of Hooghly district, West Bengal, India
Sit Mamudpur, a village in Mirzapur Upazila in Tangail District, Bangladesh